MS Enchanted Capri is a wrecked  cruise ship owned by Demar Instaladora y Constructora, Mexico and operated as an accommodation vessel for oil rigs in the Gulf of Mexico. She was built in 1975 at Wärtsilä Turku Shipyard in Turku, Finland as the 15,409 GRT MS Azerbaydzhan for the Soviet Union-based Black Sea Shipping Company. She had also sailed under the names MS Arkadia and MS Island Holiday.

History

The Azerbaydzhan was built in 1975 as the third ship of the five Belorussiya class passenger ships ordered by the Soviet Union from the Wärtsilä shipyard in Turku, Finland. She underwent refurbishments in 1984 in Bremerhaven, Germany and in 1997 in Freeport, Grand Bahama. In 1996, the vessel was acquired by BLASCO, Ukraine and renamed Arkadia (Arkadiya).

The ship was chartered by SeaEscape, Florida and renamed Island Holiday.

On June 4, 1998, Commodore Cruise Line chartered the vessel, renamed her Enchanted Capri and started 2 and 5-day cruises from New Orleans, Louisiana with an emphasis on gaming. With 248 cabins, including eight suites, and eight passenger decks, the Enchanted Capri offered full cruise amenities such as swimming pools, restaurants, gift shops, bars, lounges, theater, disco, gym, sauna, beauty salon, and complete hospital facilities. Commodore Holdings Limited, the parent company to Commodore Cruise Line, and Casino America, Inc. announced that they had executed a definitive agreement under which Casino America would manage the casino operations aboard this ship. The onboard casino, with slots and a variety of table games, was under the Isle of Capri Casinos banner. Following Commodore's bankruptcy on January 11, 2001, the Enchanted Capri made news when the ship was arrested in New Orleans by the International Transport Workers' Federation on behalf of the crew, who were owed $500,000 in back wages. More than 230 crew stranded on the passenger vessel were sent home to forty different countries in the biggest repatriation operation staged by the ITWF.

The Enchanted Capri was laid up, her owners chartered her to the Mexican company Demar Instaladora y Constructora in 2003 and refurbished the vessel in 2005 to bring her up to the latest SOLAS standards. At the end of 2007 Enchanted Capri was totally owned by the Mexican company Demar Instaladora y Constructora.

In 2020, it was planned to scrap her in Coatzacoalcos.  However, she grounded in Alvarado after dragging anchor in a storm. The vessel was abandoned and still aground as of December 2021.

References

External links

 Professional photographs from shipspotting.com
 Enchanted Capri 1998 Fact Sheet
 Enchanted Capri's General Arrangement
 Demar Instaladora y Constructora MEXICO

Cruise ships
Cruiseferries
Ships built in Turku
Passenger ships of the Soviet Union
Finland–Soviet Union relations
1975 ships
Ships of Black Sea Shipping Company